Boston Concert is a live solo album by pianist Tete Montoliu recorded in Boston in 1980 and originally released on the Danish label, SteepleChase as a double LP in 1981 then released in 1989 as two single CD volumes.

Track listing
Disc one
 Introduction1:34 Bonus track on CD released
 "New England Blues"7:17
 "I Guess I'll Hang My Tears Out to Dry" (Jule Styne, Sammy Cahn)9:10
 "Have You Met Miss Jones?" (Richard Rodgers, Lorenz Hart)5:15
 "Catalan Suite" (Traditional)16:15
 "Hot House" (Tadd Dameron)5:00
Disc two
 "Airegin" (Sonny Rollins)6:20
 "Lush Life" (Billy Strayhorn)8:00
 "Giant Steps" (John Coltrane)4:15
 "When I Fall in Love" (Victor Young, Edward Heyman)1:55
 "A Child Is Born" (Thad Jones)2:30
 "Confirmation" (Charlie Parker)5:10
 "Apartment 512" (Tete Montoliu)11:50
 "Oleo/Come Sunday/Oleo" (Rollis/Duke Ellington/Rollins)3:00

Personnel
Tete Montoliu – piano

References

Tete Montoliu live albums
1981 live albums
SteepleChase Records live albums
Solo piano jazz albums